Dragonworld is a 1994 American direct-to-video family fantasy film directed by Ted Nicolaou. It is the third film to be released by Moonbeam Entertainment, the family video division of Full Moon Entertainment.

Plot
Set in modern times, a young five-year-old boy named Johnny McGowan travels to Scotland to live at his grandfather's castle after he loses both his parents in a traffic collision. At the magical wish tree on his grandfather's estate, he conjures up a friend, which is an infant dragon whom he nicknames "Yowler". They grow up together as 15 years go by. In that time, his grandfather passes away and Yowler has grown to full size. One day after the years go by, documentary filmmaker Bob Armstrong, his daughter Beth, and his pilot Brownie McGee stumble upon Yowler. Eager for fame and money, Bob convinces John to "rent" Yowler to local corrupt businessman, Lester McIntyre. John, who is coerced in part by the offer to have the mounting taxes on the castle paid off, allows Lester to take Yowler in. He does so also partly because of his growing interest in Beth. Yowler is miserable and harassed in the new amusement park built for him, and when it becomes clear that McIntyre has duped them in order to exploit the dragon, John and his new friends take action.

Cast
 Sam Mackenzie as Johnny McGowan
 Courtland Mead as Young Johnny McGowan
 Richard Trask as Yowler the Dragon
 Janet Henfrey as Miss Twittingham
 Brittney Powell as Beth Armstrong
 John Calvin as Bob Armstrong
 John Woodvine as Lester MacIntyre
 Jim Dunk as Brownie McGee
 Lila Kaye as Mrs. Cosgrove
 Andrew Keir as Angus McGowan

Soundtrack

Filming locations
Haddon Hall and Manorbier Castle were used as locations during filming. Llangollen railway station was used as the Scottish station where the youngster first meets his grandfather.

Home media
The film was released directly to videocassette and LaserDisc in 1994 by Paramount Home Video. It was re-issued on VHS in 1996, under the Paramount Family Favorites label. The film has been seen on DVD releases in Australia and Germany. A North American Blu-ray release from Full Moon Features is scheduled for February 8, 2022.

Sequel
A sequel to the film, Dragonworld: The Legend Continues, was released directly to video in 1999, although filmed in 1996. The film bears little relation to the first film and has received mainly negative reviews from critics.

References

External links

 
 
 
 Detailed info on Dragonworld (including plot detail)
 plot review

1994 films
Films about dragons
Films using stop-motion animation
American fantasy films
English-language Scottish films
English-language Romanian films
Scottish films
British fantasy films
Romanian fantasy films
Films directed by Ted Nicolaou
Films scored by Richard Band
Films shot in Scotland
Films set in Scotland
Films about orphans
Paramount Pictures direct-to-video films
1990s English-language films
1990s American films
1990s British films